"Angry" is a popular song, with lyrics by Dudley Mecum and music by Henry Brunies, Merritt Brunies, and Jules Cassard, written in 1925. Ted Lewis and His Band first recorded the instrumental version on June 22, 1925, and then on June 26, 1925, The Whispering Pianist (Art Gillham) recorded the first vocal version.

The song is considered a barbershop quartet standard and was used as the signature song of popular big band bandleader leader Harry Lawrence "Tiny" Hill. Hill made three recordings of the song, the first being on Vocalion Records #4957 on June 1, 1939. Hill's later recordings were both released on Mercury Records in 1946 #1053 (recorded 1945) and #6001.

Other notable versions
Rosemary Clooney - for her album Rosie Solves the Swingin' Riddle! (1961).
Perry Como - included in his album We Get Letters (1957).
Earl Hines and his orchestra recorded the song on 13 September 1934 for Decca Records (catalog No. 183A), in an arrangement by bassist Quinn Wilson.
Kay Starr - a single release that reached No. 26 in the Billboard charts in 1951.

References

1925 songs